Events of 2022 in Fiji.

Incumbents

Government of Fiji 

 President: Wiliame Katonivere
 Prime Minister: Frank Bainimarama (until 24 December); Sitiveni Rabuka onwards
 Speaker: Epeli Nailatikau

Events 
Ongoing – COVID-19 pandemic in Fiji

 27 May – Fiji announces that it will become the 14th member of the Indo-Pacific Economic Framework for Prosperity in order to counter Chinese influence in the Pacific. This comes amid a visit by Chinese foreign minister Wang Yi to Kiribati.
 24 June – Fiji reports its first suspected case of monkeypox.
 11 July – The 51st Pacific Islands Forum begins in Suva, amid escalating geopolitical competition between China and the United States.
 16 December – Leader of People's Alliance is questioned by police after calling for the military to intervene in the electoral process of the 2022 Fijian election.
 18 December – Final election result shows that the government of Fiji is poised to be a hung parliament. Incumbent long-time leader Frank Bainimarama loses majority.
 22 December – Fiji mobilises its army in response to threats made against the country's minority groups and civil unrest.
 24 December – Sitiveni Rabuka is confirmed as the new prime minister. Rabuka will hold the office again more than two decades after first leading the country as prime minister.

Deaths 

 23 January – Osea Naiqamu, 60, politician.
 2 February – Mosese Taga, 57, rugby union player.
 23 February – Joeli Vidiri, 48, rugby union player.
 29 August – Jai Ram Reddy, 85, politician.

See also 

2022–23 South Pacific cyclone season
2022 Pacific typhoon season

References 

 
Fiji
Fiji
2020s in Fiji
Years of the 21st century in Fiji